The Tide is a Nigerian daily newspaper. It is the most widely circulated newspaper published in Port Harcourt, Rivers State and  one of Nigeria's major newspapers. Owned and funded by the state, The Tide began printing operations on 1 December 1971 and has a digital version.

Fire
On 20 July 2012, a fire broke out in The Tides main building, damaging significant portions of the establishment, including the General Manager's office, Credit Control Unit, Administration General office and Board Room. Although no injuries or deaths were reported, much of the company's equipment and staff documents were destroyed. According to a statement from the General Manager Mr. Celestine Ogolo, the fire started at around 2.00a.m and quickly took over the highest floor of the building where his office was stationed. Temporary workspaces were later provided to staff whose offices were affected by the fire.

See also

List of newspapers in Nigeria

References

External links
The Tide's official website

Newspapers established in 1971
Mass media companies based in Port Harcourt
Newspapers published in Port Harcourt
1971 establishments in Nigeria
1970s establishments in Rivers State
English-language newspapers published in Africa
Daily newspapers published in Nigeria